Ithycyphus miniatus is a species of venomous snake in the family Pseudoxyrhophiidae. The species is native to Madagascar.

Venom
I. miniatus is calm and reluctant to bite, but has a venom capable of causing severe pain and extensive bleeding in humans.

Behavior and diet
I. miniatus is small and nocturnal and preys on grey mouse lemurs and other small mammals.

In local folklore
The common name of I. miniatus in Malagasy is fandrefiala, and it is greatly feared by many rural people of Madagascar, who believe it is able to hypnotize humans with its gaze.

Taxonomy
I. miniatus was originally described and named by Hermann Schlegel in 1837.

References

Further reading
Boulenger GA (1896). Catalogue of the Snakes in the British Museum (Natural History). Volume III., Containing the Colubridæ (Opisthoglyphæ and Proteroglyphæ), ... London: Trustees of the British Museum (Natural History). (Taylor and Francis, printers). xiv + 727 pp. + Plates I-XXV. (Ithycyphus miniatus, p. 35).
Duméril AMC, Bibron G, Duméril AHA (1854). Erpétologie générale ou histoire naturelle complète des reptiles. Tome septième. Deuxième partie. Comprenant l'histoire des serpents venimeux. Paris: Roret. xii + pp. 781–1536. (Dryophylax miniatus, p. 1120). (in French).
Glaw F, Vences M (2006). A Field Guide to the Amphibians and Reptiles of Madagascar: Third Edition. Cologne, Germany: Vences & Glaw Verlag. 496 pp. .
Jan G (1863). Elenco sistematico degli ofidi descritti e disegnati per l'iconografia generale. Milan: A. Lombardi. vii + 143 pp. (Philodryas miniatus, p. 84). (in Italian).

Pseudoxyrhophiidae
Reptiles of Madagascar
Taxa named by Hermann Schlegel
Reptiles described in 1867